Malted milk or malt powder   is a powdered gruel made from a mixture of malted barley, wheat flour, and evaporated whole milk powder. The powder is used to add its distinctive flavor to beverages and other foods, but it is also used in baking to help dough cook properly.

History

London pharmacist James Horlick developed ideas for an improved, wheat- and malt-based nutritional supplement for infants. Despairing of his opportunities in the United Kingdom, Horlick joined his brother William, who had gone to Racine, Wisconsin, in the United States, to work at a relative's quarry. In 1873, the brothers formed J & W Horlicks  to manufacture their brand of infant food in nearby Chicago. Ten years later, they earned a patent for a new formula enhanced with dried milk. The company originally marketed its new product as "Diastoid", but trademarked the name "malted milk" in 1887.

Despite its origins as a health food for infants and invalids, malted milk found unexpected markets. Explorers appreciated its lightweight, nonperishable, nourishing qualities, and they took malted milk on treks worldwide. William Horlick became a patron of Antarctic exploration, and Admiral Richard E. Byrd named Horlick Mountains, a mountain range in Antarctica, after him. Back in the US, people began drinking Horlick's new beverage for enjoyment. James Horlick returned to England to import his American-made product and was eventually made a baronet. Malted milk became a standard offering at soda shops, and found greater popularity when mixed with ice cream in a "malt", for which malt shops were named.

Uses
 Malted milk biscuits
 Malted milkshakes
 Malted soyabean milk
 Malted hot drinks, such as Horlicks and Ovaltine
 Malted milk balls: malted milk is used in the candy confections Whoppers (manufactured by Hershey Co.), Mighty Malts (manufactured by Necco), and Maltesers (manufactured by Mars, Inc).  
 Malted milk is used in some bagel recipes as a substitute for non-diastatic malt powder.

See also
Flavored milk
 List of barley-based drinks
 Nesquik
 Nestlé Milo

References

External links

What is Malted milk? – TheSpruceEats

Barley-based drinks
Wheat-based drinks
Milk-based drinks
Cold drinks
Milk
Food ingredients
Non-alcoholic drinks
Food powders